Toro District is one of eleven districts of the province La Unión in Peru.

Geography 
Other mountains are listed below:

References